The Tony Bennett Bill Evans Album is a 1975 studio album by singer Tony Bennett, accompanied by pianist Bill Evans.

Their second album together, Together Again was released in 1977. Both albums plus alternate takes and additional tracks were released on The Complete Tony Bennett/Bill Evans Recordings by Fantasy in 2009.

Track listing
 "Young and Foolish" (Albert Hague, Arnold B. Horwitt) – 3:54
 "The Touch of Your Lips" (Ray Noble) – 3:56
 "Some Other Time" (Leonard Bernstein, Betty Comden, Adolph Green) – 4:42
 "When in Rome" (Cy Coleman, Carolyn Leigh) – 2:55
 "We'll Be Together Again" (Carl T. Fischer, Frankie Laine) – 4:38
 "My Foolish Heart" (Ned Washington, Victor Young) – 4:51
 "Waltz for Debby" (Bill Evans, Gene Lees) – 4:04
 "But Beautiful" (Johnny Burke, Jimmy Van Heusen) – 3:36
 "Days of Wine and Roses" (Henry Mancini, Johnny Mercer) – 2:23

Personnel
Tony Bennett - vocals
Bill Evans - piano

Recording location
Fantasy Studios, Berkeley, California.

External links
Jazz Discography entries for Bill Evans
Bill Evans Memorial Library discography

References 

1975 albums
Tony Bennett albums
Bill Evans albums
Vocal–instrumental duet albums
Columbia Records albums